Cleveland County Council was the county council of the non-metropolitan county of Cleveland in north east England. It came into its powers on 1 April 1974 and was abolished on 31 March 1996.

History
The county council came into its powers on 1 April 1974 and established its base at Municipal Buildings in Middlesbrough. It adopted the motto "Endeavour" to commemorate the name of Captain James Cook's ship, HMS Endeavour, which, in February 1768, was dispatched on a mission to find the postulated continent Terra Australis Incognita (or "unknown southern land") in the south Pacific.

Following the recommendations of the Banham Commission, which had recommended the transfer of power in the county to unitary authorities, the county council was abolished on 31 March 1996. It was replaced with four unitary authorities: Hartlepool, Stockton-on-Tees, Middlesbrough and Redcar and Cleveland. The four districts were re-allocated to the ceremonial counties of County Durham (Hartlepool and north Stockton) and North Yorkshire (south Stockton, Middlesbrough and Redcar & Cleveland) so facilitating the abolition of the ceremonial county of Cleveland as well as the abolition of the administrative county of Cleveland.

Political control
The first election to the council was held in 1973, initially operating as a shadow authority before coming into its powers on 1 April 1974. Political control of the council from 1973 until its abolition in 1996 was held by the following parties:

Leadership
The leaders of the council included:

Council elections
1973 Cleveland County Council election
1977 Cleveland County Council election
1981 Cleveland County Council election
1985 Cleveland County Council election
1989 Cleveland County Council election
1993 Cleveland County Council election

References

Former county councils of England
History of Tyne and Wear
1974 establishments in England
1996 disestablishments in England
County Council
Council elections in Cleveland
County council elections in England